The Lumeneo Neoma was a city electric car manufactured by Lumeneo in France. The concept car was unveiled at the 2010 Paris Motor Show. Production began in March 2013, and retail deliveries in the French market began in May 2013.

Only three units were sold during its first month in the market. After selling only 10 units the manufacturer filed for bankruptcy in November 2013.

See also
Electric car use by country
Government incentives for plug-in electric vehicles
List of electric cars currently available
List of modern production plug-in electric vehicles
 List of production battery electric vehicles
 Lumeneo SMERA
 Plug-in electric vehicle

References

External links
Official website

Electric city cars
Production electric cars
Cars introduced in 2013